Jonny Hector (born 13 February 1964) is a Swedish chess player. In  chess, he received the FIDE title of Grandmaster (GM) in 1991. In correspondence chess, he earned the ICCF title of Grandmaster (GM) in 1999.

Born in Malmö, Sweden, Hector has lived in Denmark for many years. He learned chess at the relatively late age of 14, but quickly became a very strong player. In 1987 he was equal first in the strong Cappelle-la-Grande open (with Anthony Kosten and Anatoly Vaisser).

In 2002, he won the Swedish championship at Skara.

He has reached a tie in 1st place in the Politiken Cup in Copenhagen four times. In 2000, he tied with Boris Gulko and Lars Bo Hansen. In 2006, he tied with Vadim Malakhatko and Nigel Short. In 2008, he tied with Sergei Tiviakov, Vladimir Malakhov, Yuriy Kuzubov, Peter Heine Nielsen, and Boris Savchenko. In 2012, he tied with Ivan Sokolov and Ivan Cheparinov.

He has an aggressive attacking style, and is known for playing unusual chess openings, for example the  Milner-Barry Gambit of the French Defense and the Charousek Variation of the Ruy Lopez, Classical Defense.

References

External links

 
 
 
 
 

1964 births
Living people
Swedish chess players
Chess grandmasters
Correspondence chess grandmasters
Chess double grandmasters
Sportspeople from Malmö